Jobs With Justice (JWJ) is a labor rights organization in the United States, focused on the vision that all workers should be able to collectively bargain.  It was founded in 1987 and is made up of individuals and affiliated organizations. As of 2022, Jobs With Justice coalitions existed in over 30 cities or states in all regions of the country.  In 2012 Jobs With Justice announced a merger with American Rights at Work, another U.S. union advocate organization. Jobs With Justice is based in Washington, D.C., and is led by Executive Director Erica Smiley.

History

Founding 
Jobs With Justice was founded in 1987, with its inaugural convening in Miami, Florida, on July 29, 1987, where 11,000 people gathered and recited what became known as the "Jobs With Justice Pledge." The pledge is a commitment to show up for workers' fights at least five times each year. Well over 100,000 have since taken the Jobs With Justice Pledge which urges signatories to:

 Stand up for our rights as working people to a decent standard of living;
 Support the rights of all workers to organize and bargain collectively;
 Fight for secure family-wage jobs in the face of corporate attacks on working people and our communities;
 Organize the unorganized to take aggressive action to secure a better economic future for all of us; and,
 Mobilize those already organized to join the fight for jobs with justice.

Merger with American Rights At Work 
In 2012, Jobs With Justice merged with fellow labor rights group American Rights at Work forming a single organization under the Jobs With Justice banner.

Projects 
Jobs With Justice works on a variety of campaigns, research projects, and policy work. Here is a sampling of their current projects:

Advancing Black Strategists Initiative 
The Advancing Black Strategists Initiative (ABSI) is a joint project of Jobs With Justice Education Fund, Institute for Policy Studies' Black Workers Initiative, and Morehouse College International Comparative Labor Studies.

Always Essential 
Always Essential emerged in late-2020 during the COVID-19 pandemic after millions of workers across the United States were suddenly deemed "essential," but often lacked the health and safety protections they needed. Always Essential collaborated with local and national partners on a variety of campaigns and as of early-2022 remained active.

Caring Across Generations 
Founded in collaboration with the National Domestic Workers Alliance and in partnership with 200 other organizations, Caring Across Generations is a "national initiative to transform the long-term care system and change the way we care in this country." Caring Across Generations works to shape and change policy to help reshape what is possible for the caregiving industry.

Other recent projects

STRIKE!: The Game of Worker Rebellion 
TESA Collective and Jobs With Justice funded a labor organizing game on Kickstarter. In STRIKE!: The Game of Worker Rebellion, players grow their ranks, mobilize workers, and organize strikes around their city. The campaign for the game ran during a union drive at Kickstarter.

The Future We Need book 
On April 15, 2022, Jobs With Justice Executive Director Erica Smiley and former Jobs With Justice Executive Director Sarita Gupta published their book The Future We Need: Organizing for a Better Democracy in the Twenty-First Century, published by Cornell University Press.

The book shares stories of working people from around the country and across sectors of work and how the concept of collective bargaining isn't just crucial to earning a fair return on work, but is crucial to sustaining democracy. The book features a foreword by NFL Players Association Executive Director DeMaurice Smith.

Previous projects

Faith in Action
The organization works with religious leaders to support workers' rights and engages clergy in demonstrations, rallies and protests as well as corporate and comprehensive organizing and collective bargaining campaigns.

Student Labor Action Project
Founded in 1999, Student Labor Action Project (SLAP) engages students and youth on their campuses and in communities. SLAP sponsors the National Student Labor Week of Action, in which students organize protests and educational events in support of workers and unions. SLAP organizes roughly 200 events each year during the Labor Week of Action.

Worker's Rights Boards
The WRB strategy was developed as part of a protest at National Labor Relations Board (NLRB) offices in the U.S. in June 1993. More than 7,000 people participated in this experiment, and 400 people were arrested. Jobs With Justice has continued to hold WRBs across the country on an as-needed basis to investigate abuse of workers' rights. The boards are often composed of leading clergy, members of Congress, academics, retired judges and others who support workers' rights. WRBs review worker complaints and often conduct public hearings. Employers encouraged to participate, and follow-up meetings with management are sought.  The WRB then reports its findings in a public report and press conference and attempts to resolve any disputes between employers and employees. Prominent members of worker's rights boards have included Rep. Major Owens (D-N.Y.), Rep. Dennis Kucinich, former labor leader Bill Fletcher, movie producer Robert Greenwald and others.

See also
Social Movement Unionism
Community Unionism
Union Organizer
United States Student Association
Philadelphia Jobs with Justice

References

External links

Jobs With Justice
Rick Rice Papers. circa 1960-1999. University of Washington Libraries, Special Collections.
The Future We Need: Organizing for a Better Democracy in the Twenty-First Century

Workers' rights organizations based in the United States
1987 establishments in Florida
501(c)(4) nonprofit organizations
Non-profit organizations based in Washington, D.C.
Organizations established in 1987